Ron Harms (born September 11, 1936) is a former American football coach. He served as head football coach at Concordia University Nebraska from 1964 to 1969, at Adams State College—now known as Adams State University—from 1970 to 1973 and at Texas A&M University–Kingsville (formerly Texas A&I University) from 1979 to 1999, compiling a career college football coaching record of 219–112–4.  Harms was inducted into the College Football Hall of Fame in 2012.

Harms was the 12th head football coach at Adams State College in Alamosa, Colorado and he held that position for four seasons, from 1970 until 1973.  His coaching record at Adams State was 21–14–2.

Harms served as offensive coordinator for Gil Steinke in 1974 and 1975 before becoming an assistant to Grant Teaff at Baylor University for three years. Harms returned to Texas A&I in 1979 to replace Fred Jonas as head coach. In his first season, he guided the Javelinas to a NAIA national championship. With Harms at the helm, the Javelinas captured ten Lone Star Conference championships in total.

Head coaching record

Football

See also
 List of college football coaches with 200 wins

References

External links
 

1936 births
Living people
Adams State Grizzlies football coaches
Baylor Bears football coaches
Concordia Bulldogs football coaches
Texas A&M–Kingsville Javelinas football coaches
Valparaiso Beacons football players
College Football Hall of Fame inductees
Sportspeople from Houston
Coaches of American football from Texas
Players of American football from Houston